Andre Agassi was the defending champion but lost in the final 6–2, 6–3 against Pete Sampras.

Seeds
A champion seed is indicated in bold text while text in italics indicates the round in which that seed was eliminated.

  Andre Agassi (final)
  Pete Sampras (champion)
  Michael Chang (semifinals)
  MaliVai Washington (first round)
  Mark Philippoussis (second round)
  Brett Steven (first round)
  Greg Rusedski (quarterfinals)
  Hernán Gumy (first round)

Draw

References
 1996 Sybase Open Draw

SAP Open
1996 ATP Tour